Manhattan Soccer Club is an American soccer organization based in New York City. It has a large youth set-up, with over 80 teams and 1500 players spanning ages from 3-23.  In December 2018, Manhattan SC launched an adult team that competes in USL League Two.

History
Manhattan Soccer Club was formed in 1997 as an aspirational splinter of a recreational soccer league on NYC's Upper West Side. Over the next five years, Manhattan SC grew rapidly while remaining firmly planted in a few local leagues. The Club began to expand its footprint in the mid-2000s when the first few of what would be many subsequent State and Regional level teams were formed within the NYC soccer landscape. With the renovation and development of Randall's Island Park in the late 2000s, Manhattan SC found a home for training and games that matched our ambitions for growth as an organization.

Beginning in 2009, Manhattan SC launched an annual tournament held in the first week of March, each year drawing hundreds of top regional, national and international teams to the NYC metro area. With the addition of a College Showcase to the tournament a few years later,  the club's name recognition and reputation rose with each successive year.

By 2010, Manhattan SC fielded premier boys and girls teams in a variety of leagues and divisions, capturing several State titles and putting a stamp on the Regional landscape. 

In that same year, the Club took another huge step toward regional and national relevance, when the Board of Directors approved the transition from a mainly volunteer organization to professional full-time staff, complete with an Executive Director and DOC's to develop and implement a club-wide soccer curriculum.

Since that time, the Club has enjoyed continued success on the field, capturing over thirty Cup titles, twenty Premier League titles and three National Championships as well as a significant number of individual premier tournament titles.

December 2018 brought another leap forward with Manhattan SC entering the a team in the semi-professional USL League Two, in the fourth tier of the U.S. soccer system.  In March 2019 with the Club's acceptance into the Boys ECNL.

Year-by-year

References

USL League Two teams
1997 establishments in New York City
Association football clubs established in 1997
Soccer clubs in New York City